Urban Soul was a UK/US house music studio project assembled by producer, songwriter and vocalist Roland Clark.

Biography
Urban Soul hit the US Hot Dance Music/Club Play chart seven times through the 1990s, including hitting #1 in 1997 with the track "Show Me."  Other Urban Soul tracks featured vocals by Sandy B, Ceybil Jeffries and Troyetta Knox.

UK chart singles
"Alright" (1991) – UK #60
"Alright" (remix) (1991) – UK #43
"Always" (1992) – UK #41
"Love Is So Nice" (1998) – UK #75

See also
List of number-one dance hits (United States)
List of artists who reached number one on the US Dance chart

References

American house music groups
American house musicians
American electronic music groups
Chrysalis Records artists